The 2009 Swedish Golf Tour, titled as the 2009 SAS Masters Tour for sponsorship reasons, was the 26th season of the Swedish Golf Tour.

All tournaments also featured on the 2009 Nordic Golf League.

Schedule
The following table lists official events during the 2009 season.

Order of Merit
The Order of Merit was based on prize money won during the season, calculated using a points-based system.

See also
2009 Danish Golf Tour
2009 Swedish Golf Tour (women)

Notes

References

Swedish Golf Tour
Swedish Golf Tour